U.S. Highway 2 (US-2) is a state highway in the U.S. state of Idaho. It extends  from the Washington state line and State Highway 41 (SH-41) in Oldtown, east to the Montana state line near Moyie Springs.

Route description

US-2 enters Idaho at the Washington state line in Oldtown, intersecting SH-41 at the state line. It heads east out of Oldtown, crossing the Pend Oreille River, and continues east to Priest River. In Priest River, it intersects SH-57 and continues east across the Priest River. It then continues east along the Pend Oreille River past a marker for the Seneacquoteen historic site. It then turns east and northeast along the river through Dover into Sandpoint, where it overlaps US-95.

The overlapping highways then turn north into Ponderay, where they intersect SH-200 and continue north and northeast into Boundary County.

In Boundary County, they continue north and northeast into Bonners Ferry, where they cross the Kootenai River, continue north, and end their overlap near Boundary County Airport. US-2 then turns east past the airport and continues through Moyie Springs and across the Moyie River before turning southeast along the Kootenai River to the Montana state line, where it exits the state.

History

US-2 was created in 1925 as part of the original system of U.S. Highways. Its original western terminus was in Bonners Ferry. In 1946, the highway was extended west to Everett, Washington, with the Idaho section taking its current route.

Major intersections

References

002
 Idaho
Transportation in Bonner County, Idaho
Transportation in Boundary County, Idaho